The Saghyz (Sağyz, Sagiz) is a river of western Kazakhstan. It ends in a number of salt lakes in the Caspian Depression. The town Saghyz lies on its upper course.

References

Rivers of Kazakhstan